Henry Adalberto Figueroa Alonzo (born 28 December 1992) is a Honduran professional footballer who plays as a centre-back for Vida. In October 2022, he received a 4-year suspension for doping violations. He previously represented the Honduras national team.

Club career

Motagua
Figueroa developed in F.C. Motagua's reserve team during his youth and was promoted to the first team in January 2012 at the age of 19. He made his debut was on 4 August 2012, in the 2–0 victory over Platense F.C. With Motagua, he won four league titles and one Honduran Supercup in 2017.

Alajuelense
On 20 December 2018, Figueroa signed with Costa Rican club Liga Deportiva Alajuelense. He made his debut on 19 January 2019 in a 1–0 home loss against A.D. San Carlos. He scored his first goal with the team the following 17 February in a 3–0 win against Guadalupe F.C. On 22 December 2019, news was released that Figueroa was selected by the Anti-Doping Commission of Costa Rica to take a doping test after Alajuelense's first leg loss against C.S. Herediano in the Apertura grand final on 8 December, however he did not appear. The next day, the club announced that Figueroa had terminated his contract. On 7 January 2020, the Costa Rican Football Federation declared Figueroa's actions of evading the doping test as doping. An investigation was conducted on Figueroa and had he been found guilty of doping he would have faced 4 years of suspension from footballing activity.

Marathón
On 20 January 2020, Honduran club C.D. Marathón announced the signing of Figueroa. He made his competitive debut the following 2 February in a 2–1 win against C.D. Honduras Progreso. He scored his first goal on 16 February in a 5–2 win against Platense. In July 2020, he received a temporary suspension for violating two articles of the World Anti-Doping Code.

Vida
On 28 January 2022, Figueroa returned to professional football, signing a two–year contract with C.D.S. Vida in the Honduran first division.

Honors

Club
Motagua
 Liga Nacional: 2014 Apertura, 2016 Apertura, 2017 Clausura, 2018 Apertura
 Honduran Supercup: 2017

References

1992 births
Living people
People from Colón Department (Honduras)
Association football defenders
Honduran footballers
Honduras international footballers
F.C. Motagua players
L.D. Alajuelense footballers
C.D. Marathón players
C.D.S. Vida players
Liga Nacional de Fútbol Profesional de Honduras players
Liga FPD players
2014 Copa Centroamericana players
2017 Copa Centroamericana players
Copa Centroamericana-winning players
2015 CONCACAF Gold Cup players
2017 CONCACAF Gold Cup players
2019 CONCACAF Gold Cup players
Doping cases in association football
Honduran sportspeople in doping cases